Pac-Car II  was developed as a student project at ETH Zürich (Swiss Federal Institute of Technology). Based on a group of students and an experienced team leader, the goal was to build a vehicle that uses as little fuel as possible. By using hydrogen fuel-cell, developed at ETH/PSI (Paul Scherrer Institute), as power source, pure water is the car's only emission. Clean mobility completed therefore the educational and energy saving aspects of the project.

Features 

 Aerodynamic (Af=0.254 m²)
 A lightweight body (total mass of 29 kg, carbon fibre materials)
 Low rolling resistance of Michelin's Radial Tyres (Cr=0.0008)
 Efficient powertrain (almost 50%)
 Use of simulation and optimization tools (CFD, FEM, MATLAB and Simulink, GESOP)

World record 

In 2005 on June 26, the PAC-Car II set a new world record in fuel-economy of 5385 km/L gasoline equivalence during the Shell Eco-Marathon in Ladoux, France. During its third race over 20.6 km the car consumed approximately 1 g of Hydrogen driving at an average speed of 30 km/h (roughly 18.6 mph). This corresponds to  gasoline equivalence. This record is certified by the Guinness Book of World Records.

References

External links 
 Pac-Car II Website

Shell Eco-marathon challengers
Concept cars
Fuel cell vehicles